Machar is a township in the Canadian province of Ontario.

Located in the Almaguin Highlands region of Parry Sound District, Machar surrounds but does not include the village of South River.

Communities
 Bray Lake
 Eagle Lake
 Maecks

Demographics 

Etymology
This township in Parry Sound District was named by Sir Oliver Mowat in 1875 for the Rev John Machar (1796-1863), a founder of the Presbyterian Church of Upper Canada in 1831 and of Queen's College (University) in 1841, where he served as principal, 1843-53.

See also
List of townships in Ontario

References

External links

Municipalities in Parry Sound District
Single-tier municipalities in Ontario
Township municipalities in Ontario